The Adventure of the Ectoplasmic Man is a 1985 mystery pastiche novel written by Daniel Stashower, featuring Sherlock Holmes and Dr. John Watson teaming up with famous magician Harry Houdini.

Titan Books republished the book in 2009, as part of its Further Adventures series, which collects a number of noted Holmesian pastiches, under the abbreviated title of The Ectoplasmic Man.

Plot
Houdini is framed for espionage but Holmes is determined to clear his name, with the real culprits being sinister blackmailers who have targeted the Prince of Wales. Can the duo solve what some believe will become known as 'The Crime of the Century' before it's too late?

See also
 Sherlock Holmes pastiches

External links
The Ectoplasmic Man at Titan Books

1985 American novels
England in fiction
Sherlock Holmes pastiches
Sherlock Holmes novels
William Morrow and Company books
Harry Houdini